Garden of Love is Rick James' fourth studio album on Motown sub-label Gordy.

Track listing 
All tracks composed by Rick James; except where noted.

Side A
"Big Time" (James Calloway, Leroy Burgess, Sonny T. Davenport) – 6:27
"Don't Give up on Love" – 6:15
"Island Lady" – 4:07

Side B
"Gettin' It On (In the Sunshine)" – 3:03
"Summer Love" – 6:19
"Mary -Go- Round" – 6:59
"Gettin' It On (In the Sunshine) Reprise" – 0:40

2010 bonus tracks / 2014 digital remaster bonus tracks / 2014 Complete Motown Albums bonus tracks
 "Gettin' It On (In the Sunshine)" [Reprise] – 1:36
 "Big Time" (Extended version – Previously unreleased) – 11:40
 "Gypsy Girl" (Unreleased demo) – 3:41

Charts

Singles

External links 
 Rick James-Garden Of Love at Discogs

References 

1980 albums
Gordy Records albums
Rick James albums
Albums produced by Rick James